Diego Rosati (born November 22, 1978) is a judoka from Argentina who competed in 2008 Summer Olympics.

References

External links
 
 Personal site
 Facebook

1978 births
Living people
Argentine male judoka
South American Games bronze medalists for Argentina
South American Games gold medalists for Argentina
South American Games medalists in judo
Competitors at the 2002 South American Games
Judoka at the 2008 Summer Olympics
Olympic judoka of Argentina
20th-century Argentine people
21st-century Argentine people